The Deputy Mayor of London for Planning, Regeneration and Skills is a position appointed by the Mayor of London. It was created as the Deputy Mayor of London for Policy and Planning and changed to the current title in 2016. The current holder is Jules Pipe.

List of Deputy Mayors for Planning, Regeneration and Skills

References

Local government in London